The Boston mayoral election of 1869 saw the reelection of Nathaniel B. Shurtleff to a third consecutive term.

Results

See also
List of mayors of Boston, Massachusetts

References

Mayoral elections in Boston
Boston
Boston mayoral
19th century in Boston